James George Beale (7 February 1881 – 19 February 1968) was a British track and field athlete who competed in the 1908 Summer Olympics and the 1912 Summer Olympics in the Men's Marathon. He finished 17th in 1908 and did not finish in 1912.

References

External links
 

1881 births
1968 deaths
Olympic athletes of Great Britain
Athletes (track and field) at the 1908 Summer Olympics
Athletes (track and field) at the 1912 Summer Olympics
British male long-distance runners
British male marathon runners